The 1952–53 season was Stoke City's 46th season in the Football League and the 32nd in the First Division.

The summer of 1952 again brought drama as long serving manager Bob McGrory resigned after spending 31 years with the club as player and manager. In his place came former Scarborough manager and Wolverhampton Wanderers defender Frank Taylor. However despite a change in leadership the team continued to struggle and were again involved in a relegation battle. The season went to the final day and Stoke went into their match against Derby County knowing they had to win to stay up, a 2–1 defeat saw Stoke's stay in the First Division come to a disappointing end.

Season review

League
During the summer of 1952 Bob McGrory resigned after spending 31 years at the Victoria Ground as player and manager and Frank Taylor took over as first team manager. Taylor was a 'new breed' of tracksuit manager and was regarded as potential great manager by the Stoke board. The first act Taylor did was to erect a sign above the players dressing room which read:  Are you 90 minutes fit? It's the last 20 minutes that count–train for it.

The 1952–53 season was obviously going to be a transitional one with the defence and forward lines in need of strengthening. A new goalkeeper was brought in, Bill Robertson coming up from Birmingham City for £8,000. The season did not start well and after one win the first five matches Taylor moved quickly to bring in Ken Thomson to the club a fine centre back from Aberdeen whilst allowing George Mountford to join Queens Park Rangers. Taylor also started to move on some of McGrory's signings but the talent from the youth team which had served Stoke for so long had now dried up.

Prior to the lead up to 1953 Stoke had agonisingly slipped into the relegation zone, but seven games without defeat at the turn of the year they seemed to have averted the danger. But then it all went wrong again and they slipped back down the table and in the end they had to win their final match of the season against an already relegated Derby County at the Victoria Ground. Most expected Stoke to step it up and beat a dejected Derby side but disaster struck as Jack Lee scored for the "Rams" early on. Stoke hit back through Frank Bowyer but Jackie Stamps but Derby 2–1 up. Stoke created plenty of chances and with just minutes left were awarded a penalty but the reliable Ken Thomson hit his kick straight at Ray Middleton and with it ended Stoke's 20 year stay in the First Division.

FA Cup
A miserable season was not helped any by a shock 1–0 defeat to Third Division North side Halifax Town in the fourth round.

Final league table

Results

Stoke's score comes first

Legend

Football League First Division

FA Cup

Squad statistics

References

Stoke City F.C. seasons
Stoke City